James Willoughby is a baseball pitcher.

James Willoughby may refer to:

James Willoughby, heir to Baron Middleton, of Middleton in the County of Warwick
James Willoughby, character in The Regiment (TV series)

See also
James Heathcote-Drummond-Willoughby, 3rd Earl of Ancaster
Willoughby (surname)